Mervin Glorinda Wyatt-Ras (born October 20, 1961) is an Aruban politician and member of the Parliament of Aruba since October 20, 2001. She was President of the Parliament between 2005 and 2009 and between 2016 and 2017.

See also

List of the first women holders of political offices in North America
List of presidents of the Parliament of Aruba
Rudy Croes

References

Aruban politicians
20th-century women
21st-century women
1961 births
Living people